The 1993–94 season was the 114th season of competitive football by Rangers.

Overview
Rangers played a total of 57 competitive matches during the 1993–94 season. The team finished first in the Scottish Premier Division and collected the sixth of their nine league titles, despite only winning 22 of their 44 league games.

During Rangers' league encounter against Raith Rovers at Ibrox on 16 April 1994, Duncan Ferguson headbutted the visitors' John McStay in the south-west corner of the Ibrox pitch. Referee Kenny Clark booked Ferguson, but he was subsequently charged with assault and, as it was his fourth such conviction, he served three months in prison.

In the cup competitions, they were defeated in the Scottish Cup final by Dundee United thanks to a Craig Brewster goal. The team did win the League Cup, beating Hibernian 2–1 with goals from Ian Durrant and Ally McCoist.

In their European campaign, Rangers crashed out of the UEFA Champions League in the first round after losing to Bulgarian outfit Levski Sofia on the away goals rule.

Transfers

In

Out 

Expendure:  £4,950,000
Income:  £1,550,000
Total loss/gain:  £3,400,000

Results
All results are written with Rangers' score first.

Scottish Premier Division

UEFA Champions League

League Cup

Scottish Cup

Appearances

League table

See also 
 1993–94 in Scottish football
Nine in a row

References

Rangers F.C. seasons
Rangers
Scottish football championship-winning seasons